The 2019 Open 13 Provence was a men's tennis tournament played on indoor hard courts. It was the 27th edition of the Open 13, and part of the ATP Tour 250 series of the 2019 ATP Tour. It took place at the Palais des Sports in Marseille, France, from 18 February through 24 February 2019. First-seeded Stefanos Tsitsipas won the singles title.

Singles main-draw entrants

Seeds 

 Rankings are as of February 11, 2019.

Other entrants 
The following players received wildcards into the main draw:
  Antoine Hoang
  Ugo Humbert
  Jo-Wilfried Tsonga

The following player received entry into the singles main draw using a protected ranking:
  Steve Darcis

The following players received entry from the qualifying draw:
  Matthias Bachinger
  Simone Bolelli
  Egor Gerasimov 
  Constant Lestienne

The following players received entry as lucky losers:
  Grégoire Barrère
  Sergiy Stakhovsky

Withdrawals 
Before the tournament
  Chung Hyeon → replaced by  Sergiy Stakhovsky
  Matthew Ebden → replaced by  Denis Kudla
  Kyle Edmund → replaced by  Peter Gojowczyk
  Márton Fucsovics → replaced by  Jiří Veselý
  Pierre-Hugues Herbert → replaced by  Hubert Hurkacz
  Karen Khachanov → replaced by  Ernests Gulbis
  Gaël Monfils → replaced by  Grégoire Barrère
  Andy Murray → replaced by  Andrey Rublev

Doubles main-draw entrants

Seeds 

1 Rankings are as of February 11, 2019.

Other entrants 
The following pairs received wildcards into the main draw:
  Jeevan Nedunchezhiyan /  Purav Raja
  Petros Tsitsipas /  Stefanos Tsitsipas

Withdrawals 
  Simone Bolelli

Finals

Singles 

  Stefanos Tsitsipas defeated  Mikhail Kukushkin, 7–5, 7–6(7–5)

Doubles 

  Jérémy Chardy /  Fabrice Martin defeated  Ben McLachlan /  Matwé Middelkoop, 6–3, 6–7(4–7), [10–3]

References

External links 
Official website

Open 13
Open 13
2019 in French tennis
Open 13